Girolamo Muziano or Mutiani (c. 1532 – 1592), was an Italian painter, one of the most prominent artists active in Rome in the mid-to-late sixteenth century.

Life
He was born in Acquafredda, near Brescia, but active mainly in Rome.

The accounts from the 16th to 20th centuries regarding Muziano's life said he began work under the tutelage of Romanino, an imitator of Titian. Yet, a nearly autobiographical story of Muziano written by his confessor (unpublished until 1954) indicates instead that Muziano was born in Brescia, and left this town as a young man, and that his first apprenticeship was under Domenico Campagnola and Lambert Sustris in 1544–46 in the town of Padua. He then spent time in Venice until 1549, but moved permanently to Rome about 1550.

He was known there as Il giovane dei paesi (the young man of the landscapes), but although he continued to draw and paint landscapes throughout his career, he aspired instead to grand manner figure painting. 
He painted historical painting in a style based largely on Michelangelo, giving great prominence to the monumental anatomy of his figures, even in works with ascetic saints as their subject. 
His Resurrection of Lazarus (1555) was painted for the Colonna palace in Subiaco. 
It established his fame; Michelangelo himself pronounced its author one of the "first artists of that age". The painting was later placed in the church of Santa Maria Maggiore above the artist's tomb; it was afterwards transferred to the Quirinal Palace, and now is in the Vatican Pinacoteca.
The painting returns to a spatial organization and narrative composition more typical of the High Renaissance than of Muziano's Mannerist contemporaries.

Muziano came to be the leading artist in Rome during the 1570-80s, painting in a style that appealed to Counter-Reformation patrons. He worked for Cardinal Ippolito II d'Este from 1560 to 1566, and his frescoes for the Cardinal's villas in  Tivoli could be seen in Villa d'Este.

His most noted paintings include Circumcision, formerly the high altarpiece in the church of the Gesù (although now removed to a corridor behind the sacristy), paintings for three chapels in Santa Maria in Aracoeli, and St Jerome preaching to Monks in the Desert in Santa Maria degli Angeli. This last painting was one of two altarpieces that Muziano painted for St. Peter's Basilica during the time when Muziano served as superintendent of works for Pope Gregory XIII (the other painting, a "Mass of St. Basil" is lost, although it is recorded in an etching by Jacques Callot). Muziano also designed mosaics for the Gregorian Chapel in the basilica, and was responsible for re-founding the Academy of St Luke (Accademia di San Luca) in Rome (1577). His works can also be seen in Santa Caterina dei Funari, the Palazzo Colonna (portrait of Vittoria Colonna), the Cathedral Museum of Orvieto, and the church of San Francesco in Frascati.

He died in 1592, and was buried in the church of Santa Maria Maggiore. Among his pupils were Paolo Rossetti of Cento and Cesare Nebbia.

Anthology of works
Christ greets the Ambassadors of John the Baptist - Museo antico Tesoro- Loreto
Landscape with waterfall (drawing) 
Three paintings

References

Attribution:

Sources

External links
Italy cyberguide entry
Brief bio of Muziano from the Web Gallery of Art

1530s births
1592 deaths
Artists from the Province of Brescia
16th-century Italian painters
Italian male painters
Italian Renaissance painters
Painters from Rome